Kristian Flittie Onstad (born 9 May 1984) is a Norwegian professional footballer defender who plays for Moss.

Career
He comes from a little place in Skedsmo, Lahaugmoen. He went to NTG (Norges Toppidrettsgymnas) high school. Kristian started his senior career at Lyn. At Lyn, he made 73 appearances.

In 2006, Kristian had a transfer to the Danish elite club Esbjerg FB. In the 2009 season he was loaned out to SK Brann. After a loan spell at SK Brann, he was released from his contract at Esbjerg FB. On 18 January 2010 Kristian signed a three-year deal with Stabæk Fotball. It was terminated in the summer. In August 2010 he joined Raufoss IL. Ahead of the 2011 he joined Ull/Kisa. In April 2013 he signed a contract with Mjøndalen. Onstad has, as of December 2013, joined Moss.

References

1984 births
Living people
People from Skedsmo
Norwegian footballers
Lyn Fotball players
Esbjerg fB players
SK Brann players
Stabæk Fotball players
Raufoss IL players
Ullensaker/Kisa IL players
Mjøndalen IF players
Moss FK players
Eliteserien players
Danish Superliga players
Norwegian First Division players
Norwegian expatriate footballers
Expatriate men's footballers in Denmark
Association football defenders
Sportspeople from Viken (county)